Apneustic respiration (a.k.a. apneusis) is an abnormal pattern of breathing characterized by deep, gasping inspiration with a pause at full inspiration followed by a brief, insufficient release.

Presentation
Accompanying signs and symptoms may include decerebrate posturing; fixed, dilated pupils; coma or profound stupor; quadriparesis; absent corneal reflex; negative oculocephalic reflex; and obliteration of the gag reflex.

Causes
It is caused by damage to the pons or upper medulla caused by strokes or trauma. Specifically, concurrent removal of input from the vagus nerve and the pneumotaxic center causes this pattern of breathing.  It is an ominous sign, with a generally poor prognosis. 

It can also be temporarily caused by some drugs, such as ketamine. It causes craniocerebral injury.

Diagnosis

See also
 Apneustic center

References

External links
About brain injury and functions

Breathing abnormalities
Brainstem